This is a partial list of recognized Saints of the Eastern Orthodox communion.

References

See also
List of Eastern Orthodox saint titles
List of Russian saints

Eastern Orthodox
 List